Pareuchaetes insulata, also known as the yellow-winged pareuchaetes, is a moth of the subfamily Arctiinae. It was described by Francis Walker in 1855. It is found on Cuba and the Antilles, as well as in the southern United States (Arizona, Florida, South Carolina and Texas), the Dominican Republic, El Salvador, Guatemala and Nicaragua.

The wingspan is 26–38 mm. Adults have been recorded on wing year round, but are most common from April to November.

The larvae feed on various plants, including Chromolaena odorata, Ageratum species and Hernandia sonora.

References

Phaegopterina
Moths described in 1855